High Energy Biscuits (HEB) are food ration bars containing high-protein cereals and vegetable fat. Because of their high energy-to-weight ratio they are procured by the World Food Programme, the food aid branch of the United Nations, for feeding disaster victims worldwide.

HEBs have been provided to a variety of geographical locations. For example, HEBs were delivered to Georgia after the 2008 South Ossetia war. HEBs were also airlifted to Kenya, and more recently distributed in aid in the 2010 Haiti earthquake, and 80 tonnes of high energy biscuits were delivered to the Tunisian border in response to the Libyan crisis.

HEBs are usually packaged in cardboard boxes weighing 10 kg each.

Composition
Per 100 g, HEBs have a minimum of 450 kcal of energy, 4.5% maximum moisture, a minimum of 10-15 g of protein, a minimum of 15 g fat, and 10-15 g sugar at a maximum.

HEBs have the following micronutrients at a minimum per 100 g:

See also
Energy bar
K-Mix 2

References

External links
EM5
World Food Program

Biscuits
Survival equipment